Yu Liang (庾亮; 289 – 14 February 340), courtesy name Yuangui (元規), formally Marquess Wenkang of Duting (都亭文康侯), was a Chinese military general and politician of the Jin dynasty who impressed many with his knowledge but whose inability to tolerate dissent and overly high evaluation of his own abilities led to the disastrous revolt of Su Jun, weakening Jin's military capability for years.

Early career 
When Yu Liang was young, he was known for his skills in rhetoric and knowledge in the Taoist philosophies of Lao Tsu and Zhuangzi.  When he was just 15, he was invited by Emperor Huai's regent Sima Yue the Prince of Donghai to be on his staff, but he declined, instead staying in Kuaiji Commandery (the southern shore of Hangzhou Bay) with his father Yu Chen (庾琛), the governor of Kuaiji.

After Sima Rui the Prince of Langye was posted to Jianye as the military commander of the area south of the Yangtze in 307, he invited Yu Liang to serve on his staff, and during that time, he became impressed by Yu's abilities and solemn attitude, and he took Yu Liang's younger sister Yu Wenjun to be his son Sima Shao's wife.  It was while in Sima Rui's service that Yu was created the Marquess of Duting.  Later, after Sima Rui claimed imperial title after Emperor Min's death in 318 (as Emperor Yuan), Yu, along with Wen Jiao, were friends and key advisors of Sima Shao, who became crown prince.  After Emperor Yuan's death and succession by Crown Prince Shao (as Emperor Ming), Yu continued to be a key advisor, and was heavily involved in his planning against and subsequent defeat of the warlord Wang Dun's forces in 324.  Yu declined all monetary awards and the title of the Duke of Yongchang, however.

The Su Jun Disturbance 
As Emperor Ming neared death in 325, he entrusted his four-year-old son Crown Prince Yan, by Yu Liang's sister Empress Yu, to a number of high-level officials, including Yu, Sima Yang (司馬羕) the Prince of Xiyang, Wang Dao, Bian Kun (卞壼), Chi Jian, Lu Ye (陸瞱), and Wen Jiao.  Initially, after he died later that year and was succeeded by Crown Prince Yan (as Emperor Cheng), the officials were in charge together, but as Empress Dowager Yu became regent, Yu Liang became effectively the most powerful official in the administration.  He changed from the lenient policies of Wang (who was prime minister during Emperor Ming's reign) to stricter applications of laws and regulations, which offended the officials accustomed to Wang's lenience.  Further, he became apprehensive of the generals Tao Kan and Zu Yue – neither of whom was mentioned in the list of honors and promotions announced by Emperor Ming's will and believed that Yu had erased their names from the will – and Su Jun, who had allowed many criminals to join his army.  In 326, he alienated public opinion by falsely accusing Sima Yang's brother Sima Zong (司馬宗) the Prince of Nandun of treason and killing him and deposing Sima Yang.

In 327, apprehensive of Su's ambitions, Yu became intent on stripping him of his military command, and he promoted Su to the post of minister of agriculture in order to do so.  Su refused and rebelled, in alliance with Zu.  Yu, initially believing that he could defeat Su easily, declined assistance from provincial officials, including Wen's Jiang Province (江州, modern Jiangxi) forces, but instead Su quickly descended on the capital Jiankang (name changed from Jianye due to naming taboo of Emperor Min's name) and captured it in early 328, taking Emperor Cheng and Empress Dowager Yu and forcing Yu Liang to flee to Wen.

Yu and Wen quickly prepared their forces for a counterattack against Su.  They invited Tao to join them, and Tao, initially refusing because of his residual anger against Yu, eventually accepted, but as Tao's forces were about to arrive, a rumor spread that Tao was going to kill Yu.  Yu, hearing the rumor, decided to greet Tao and prostrate himself, apologizing for his errors.  Tao's anger dissipated, and they joined forces, killing Su in battle in late 328 and defeating the remnants of his forces in early 329.

After Su Jun's defeat 
Initially, Yu tendered many resignations to the emperor, his nephew.  Wang Dao, as regent, turned those resignations down in the emperor's name and but instead commissioned Yu as the governor of Yu Province (豫州, by that point referring to modern central Anhui).  After Tao's death in 334, Yu succeeded him as the governor of Jing (荊州, modern Hubei and Hunan), posted to Wuchang (武昌, modern Ezhou, Hubei), Yu, and Jiang Provinces and the military commander of the western provinces.  Even though he was not in control of the government, but he continued to have great influence from his post as the emperor's uncle.

In 338, angry at what he saw as Wang's overly lenient attitude and not sufficiently grooming Emperor Cheng to rule, Yu tried to convince Chi to join him in an effort to depose Wang, but Chi refused, and Yu never carried out his plans.  Instead, in 339, he planned a major attack north against Later Zhao.  After opposing from Chi and Cai Mo, however, Emperor Cheng ordered Yu to stop his plans.  After Wang died later that year, however, the government became in control of Wang's assistant He Chong and Yu Liang's brother Yu Bing (庾冰), and Yu Liang resumed his battle preparations.  This drew a response from Later Zhao's emperor Shi Hu, who attacked several major cities and bases on the Jin/Zhao border, inflicting heavy losses and capturing Zhucheng (邾城, in modern Huanggang, Hubei) before withdrawing.  Yu, humiliated, offered to have himself demoted, and while Emperor Cheng refused, he became distressed and died on the first day of the lunar new year in 340.

References 

 Book of Jin, vol. 73.
 Zizhi Tongjian, vols. 90, 92, 93, 94, 95, 96.

289 births
340 deaths
Jin dynasty (266–420) generals
Jin dynasty (266–420) politicians
Jin dynasty (266–420) regents